Baildon railway station serves the town of Baildon near Shipley in West Yorkshire, England. The station, and all trains serving it, are operated by Northern Trains.

History
Opened by the Midland Railway in December 1876, the station became part of the London, Midland and Scottish Railway during the Grouping of 1923, and then passed to the North Eastern Region of British Railways on nationalisation in 1948.  It was then closed by the British Transport Commission as an economy measure in January 1953 (though it briefly reopened for 3 months in 1957).  Goods traffic at the station ceased in April 1964.

Services
During Monday to Saturday daytimes, there is a half-hourly service to Bradford Forster Square and Ilkley.  During Monday to Saturday evenings and all day Sunday, it is hourly in each direction.

Unlike other stations on the Wharfedale and Airedale lines, Baildon has no direct service to Leeds owing to its position on the curve between the two lines.  Passengers must instead change at Shipley or Guiseley (Shipley having more services) to access Leeds.

The site today
The line has been reduced to single track, so there is only one platform, and the station building has been sold.  The second platform is disused and covered in weeds.

The station is unstaffed, but a ticket machine is now available.  Tickets must be purchased from the machine or on the train with a Promise To Pay Notice from the same machine.  A long-line PA system and digital display screens provide train running information.  Step-free access is provided from the car park and main entrance to the platform.

Notes

References
 Railways Through Airedale & Wharfedale Martin Bairstow (2004)

External links

 Station on navigable O.S. map
 Heritage Walks around Baildon - including a Railway Walk

Railway stations in Bradford
DfT Category F1 stations
Former Midland Railway stations
Railway stations in Great Britain opened in 1876
Railway stations in Great Britain closed in 1953
Railway stations in Great Britain opened in 1957
Railway stations in Great Britain closed in 1957
Railway stations in Great Britain opened in 1973
Reopened railway stations in Great Britain
Northern franchise railway stations
1876 establishments in England